Red House or The Red House may refer to:

Places and buildings

United Kingdom 
Red House, London (disambiguation), the name of several places
Red House, Bexleyheath, designed/owned by William Morris
The Red House, Aldeburgh, home of Benjamin Britten and Peter Pears
Red House, Bournemouth, later called Langtry Manor
Red House, Buntingford
The Red House, in Red House Park, Great Barr, Sandwell
Red House, Rotherham, later called Swinden House 
The Red House, part of the Great House at Sonning
The Red House (York)
Red House Museum, Gomersal, Yorkshire
Red House School, Norton, Stockton-on-Tees
Hylton Red House, or simply Red House, a suburb of Sunderland
Red House Academy

Isle of Man 
Red House, 1 The Parade, Castletown, a Registered Buildings  of the Isle of Man
The Red House, Victoria Road, Douglas, a Registered Buildings  of the Isle of Man

United States 
Red House, New York, a town 
Red House (Manhattan), a building
Red House (South Kingstown, Rhode Island), a house 
Red House (Gay Hill, Washington County, Texas), listed on the National Register of Historic Places in Washington County, Texas
Red House, Virginia, an unincorporated community 
Red House, West Virginia, an unincorporated community
Red House Arts Center, in Syracuse, New York

Other places 
Red House (Guyana)
Red House (Hong Kong)
Red House (Solomon Islands)
Red House (Trinidad and Tobago)
Red House (Youghal), Ireland
Red House Hospital, Shanghai, China
Lodzia House, also known as Red House, Tel Aviv, Israel
Red House, a museum in Monschau, Germany
Bahay na Pula, or Red House, Bulacan, Philippines

Arts and literature
The Red House (film), a 1947 American horror film based on a 1943 George Agnew Chamberlain novel
The Red House (Haddon novel), 2012, by Mark Haddon
The Red House (Lambert novel), 1972, by Derek Lambert
"Red House" (song), by Jimi Hendrix
The Red House Mystery, a 1922 novel by A. A. Milne
Red House, a 2004 memoir by Sarah Messer

Other uses
The Red House Report, purported plans for the post-war resurrection of Germany
Red House Records, an American record label 
Red House eviction defense, a 2020–2021 protest in Portland, Oregon

See also

Redhouse (disambiguation)
Maison Rouge (disambiguation)